Gordinești is a village in Rezina District, Moldova.

http://localitati.casata.md/index.php?action=viewlocalitate&id=6720

References

Villages of Rezina District